Erind is an Albanian masculine given name. Notable people with the name include:
Erind Prifti (born 1991), Greece-born Albanian football goalkeeper
Erind Selimaj (born 1989), Albanian football player 

Albanian masculine given names